Markus Kolar (born 12 October 1984) is an Austrian handball player for Fivers Margareten and the Austrian national team.

References

1984 births
Living people
Austrian male handball players
Handball players from Vienna